The 74th season of the Campeonato Gaúcho kicked off on March 5, 1994 and ended on December 17, 1994. Twenty-four teams participated. Internacional won their 32nd title. Novo Hamburgo and São Paulo were relegated.

Participating teams

System 
The championship would be disputed in a double round-robin system, with the team with the most points winning the title, the fourteen best teams qualifying into the Division A of the 1995 championship, the teams that finished from 15th to 22nd going into Division B, and the bottom two teams being relegated.

Championship 
The format of the championship was changed that year to a double round-robin tournament, ostensibly as a preparation to reduce the number of teams in the championship. However, Grêmio, Internacional and Juventude, that, due to disputing the national divisions, had even more matches to play in the year than the others, came to December multiple matches behind, with only 17 days left until the end of the season. As a consequence, Juventude on two occasions had to play twice on the same day, and Grêmio at one point had to play three matches in one day. The length of the championship led it to be dubbed the "Interminável" (Neverending) by the press.

References 

Campeonato Gaúcho seasons
Gaúcho